"Ghoghaye Setaregan" (meaning "Turmoil of the Stars"), also known as "Emshab Dar Sar Shoori Daram" (meaning "Tonight Inside My Head There is a Delight"), is a 1960s song composed by Homayoon Khorram in Dastgah-e Shur and its lyrics was later written by Karim Fakoor in Persian and sung by Parvin Zahraee Monfared,. In 2000, the owner of the piece, Homayoun Khoram, selected Kambiz Roshanravan to arrange the orchestra and Mohammad Esfahani as the singer. The studio recording was done under his supervision and it was released as "Oje Aseman" on Tanha Mandam album along with 6 other works.

Non-compliance with copyright 
Reza Khoram (son of Homayoun Khoram) published a letter of protest from the news agencies, including the violation of copyright in the "Noise of the Stars" section. He stated: Gentlemen, it has been read. In many cases, the performances are very poor, the settings are inappropriate, the orchestration is unfavorable, the original composition of the song is awkwardly changed, the introduction and answers of the orchestra are removed or shortened, personal tastes are applied, and so on. All rights to these works in terms of music and song belong to our family, so seriously and legally and without compliments to art thieves who in any form, including cyberspace, concert performance, release of audio or video CD, music notation in the form Books, etc. Abuse of these works will be dealt with severely.

References

Persian-language songs
1960s songs
Year of song missing